Lissy may refer to:

Given name
 Lissy (actress) (born 1967), Indian actress
 Lissy Arna, German film actress Elisabeth Arndt (1900–1964)
 Lissy Gröner (1954–2019), German politician
 Lissy Jarvik (1924–2021), American psychiatrist
 Lissy Samuel (born 1967), Indian cricketer
 Lissy Sánchez (born 1995), Dominican footballer
 Lissy Schmidt (c. 1959–1994), German journalist
 Lissy Trullie, stage name of American singer-songwriter Elizabeth McChesney (born 1984)
 Lissy Vadakkel, Indian Roman Catholic nun

Other uses
 Lissy (commune), a commune in north-central France
 Lissy (film), a 1957 East German film directed by Konrad Wolf

See also
Lissie (born 1982), American singer-songwriter
Lizzie (disambiguation)

Feminine given names